Indy South Greenwood Airport  (previously Greenwood Municipal Airport) is a city-owned public-use airport in  Greenwood, a city in Johnson County, Indiana, United States. The airport was founded in September 1947 and is primarily used for general aviation. The airport has several on-field businesses, including a flight school and maintenance shop.

Facilities and aircraft 
Indy South Greenwood Airport covers an area of 208 acres (60 ha) at an elevation of 822 feet (251 m) above mean sea level. It has one runway designated 1/19 with an asphalt surface measuring 5,102 by 75 feet (1,555 x 23 m) with approved GPS and VOR approaches. In the year ending December 31, 2018, the airport had 27,944 aircraft operations, an average of 77 per day: 93% were general aviation, 3% air taxi and 4% military.
In November 2021, there were 88 aircraft based at this airport: 77 single-engine, 3 multi-engine, 5 jet and 3 helicopter.

References 

http://www.jeffairfbo.com

External links 

Airports in Indiana
Transportation buildings and structures in Johnson County, Indiana
Airports established in 1947
1947 establishments in Indiana